The Church of Nuestra Señora de la Purificación of Gazólaz, located in the village of Gazólaz, municipality of Cizur (Comunidad Foral de Navarra, Spain) is a romanesque church built at the start of the 13th century. In June 1931, it was declared Bien de Interés Cultural. 

The church was built by the architects of the Order of San Juan. Historians claim that Pedro Ximénez who was the bishop of Pamplona from 1242 to 1266 ordered its construction.

References 

The information in this article is based on that in its Spanish equivalent.

External links 

Romanesque architecture in Navarre
Nuestra Senora
Bien de Interés Cultural landmarks in Navarre
Churches in Navarre